Tour 2011 Passenger: We Are Passionate Messenger is a live concert DVD  by the Japanese rock band Nico Touches the Walls released on January, 11 2012. The DVD contains all their songs from the album "Passenger" and some of their previous successes.

Track listing 
 Rodeo
 The Bungy
 容疑者 (Yougisha)
 Sudden Death Game
 SURVIVE
 Page 1
 君だけ (Kimi Dake)
 Matryoshka
 Te wo Tatake
 友情讃歌 (Yuujou Sanka)
 Hologram
 妄想隊員A (Mousou Taiin A)
 Diver
 Passenger
 Ame no Blues

References

Nico Touches the Walls albums
2012 video albums